Olivia McCarthy, known professionally as JOY., is an Australian musician, singer, and Record producer from Brisbane. She supported Tkay Maidza on tour in 2015. Olivia is signed to Sony Music Australia and was the main support for Demi Lovato's Tell Me You Love Me World Tour on the European leg in 2018. She was originally discovered through Triple J Unearthed.

Discography

Extended plays

Singles

As lead artist

As featured artist

References

External links
Official Facebook page 

Living people
Australian women pop singers
People from Brisbane
1998 births
Sony Music artists